A watchtower or watch tower is a type of fortification used in many parts of the world. It differs from a regular tower in that its primary use is military and from a turret in that it is usually a freestanding structure. Its main purpose is to provide a high, safe place from which a sentinel or guard may observe the surrounding area. In some cases, non-military towers, such as religious towers, may also be used as watchtowers.

History

Military watchtowers

The Romans built numerous towers as part of a system of communications, one example being the towers along Hadrian's Wall in Britain. Romans built many lighthouses, such as the Tower of Hercules in northern Spain, which survives to this day as a working building, and the equally famous lighthouse at Dover Castle, which survives to about half its original height as a ruin.

In medieval Europe, many castles and manor houses, or similar fortified buildings, were equipped with watchtowers. In some of the manor houses of western France, the watchtower equipped with arrow or gun loopholes was one of the principal means of defense. A feudal lord could keep watch over his domain from the top of his tower.

In southern Saudi Arabia and Yemen, small stone and mud towers called "qasaba" were constructed as either watchtowers or keeps in the Asir mountains. Furthermore, in Najd, a watchtower, called "Margab", was used to watch for approaching enemies far in distance and shout calling warnings from atop.

Scotland saw the construction of Peel towers that combined the function of watchtower with that of a keep or tower house that served as the residence for a local notable family.

Mediterranean countries, and Italy in particular, saw the construction of numerous coastal watchtowers since the early Middle Ages, connected to the menace of Saracen attacks from the various Muslim states existing at the time (such as the Balearic Islands, Ifriqiya or Sicily). 
Later (starting from the 16th century) many were restored or built against the Barbary pirates.  Similarly, the city state of Hamburg gained political power in the 13th century over a remote island 150 kilometers down the Elbe river estuary to erect the Great Tower Neuwerk by 1310 to protect its trading routes. They also claimed customs at the watchtower protecting the passage.

Some notable examples of military Mediterranean watchtowers include the towers that the Knights of Malta had constructed on the coasts of Malta. These towers ranged in size from small watchtowers to large structures armed with numerous cannons. They include the Wignacourt, de Redin, and Lascaris towers, named for the Grand Master, such as Martin de Redin, that commissioned each series.

The name of Tunisia's second biggest city, Sfax, is the berber-punic translation from the greek "Taphroúria" (Ταφρούρια) meaning watchtower, which may mean that the 9th century Muslim town was built as an extension of what is currently known as the Kasbah, one of the corners of the surviving complete rampart of the medina.

In the Channel Islands, the Jersey Round Towers and the Guernsey loophole towers date from the late 18th century. They were erected to give warning of attacks by the French.

The Martello towers that the British built in the UK and elsewhere in the British Empire were defensive fortifications that were armed with cannon and that were often within line of sight of each other. One of the last Martello towers to be built was Fort Denison in Sydney harbour. The most recent descendants of the Martello Towers are the flak towers that the various combatants erected in World War II as mounts for anti-aircraft artillery.

Modern warfare

In modern warfare the relevance of watchtowers has decreased due to the availability of alternative forms of military intelligence, such as reconnaissance by spy satellites and unmanned aerial vehicles. However watch towers have been used in counter-insurgency wars to maintain a military presence in conflict areas in case such as by the French Army in French Indochina, by the British Army and the RUC in Northern Ireland and the IDF in Gaza and West Bank.

Non-military watchtowers

An example of the non-military watchtower in history is the one of Jerusalem. Though the Hebrews used it to keep a watch for approaching armies, the religious authorities forbade the taking of weapons up into the tower as this would require bringing weapons through the temple. Rebuilt by King Herod, that Watchtower was renamed after Mark Antony, his friend who battled against Gaius Julius Caesar Octavianus (later Augustus) and lost.

See also

 Diaolou
 Fire lookout tower
 Observation towers are similar constructions being usually outside of fortifications. A similar use have also Control towers on airports or harbours.

References

External links
 

Fortified towers by type